Karragullen is a suburb of Perth, Western Australia, located within the City of Armadale. Its postcode is 6111.

Prior to 1949 it was a stopping place on the Upper Darling Range Railway.

The suburb is an agricultural area and is predominantly known as orchard country. Many of the orchards were developed by Italian migrants in the 1930s and 1940s and these have subsequently been taken over by their 1st and 2nd generation Australian descendants.

The Karragullen area borders the Canning Dam reservoir zone and borders the start of bushland in the East-South-East direction from Perth.  It neighbours Pickering Brook to the east and Roleystone to the west.

Once a year Karragullen hosts a field day that showcases the local industries and its practices. The event has been running for over 20 years.

December 2004 saw a fire ravage most of the bushland and some areas of orchard. Fire fighters and locals rallied together to battle the blaze that is believed to have been started by an arsonist.

See also
Darling Scarp

General references
 Webb, E.G. (Eric Godfrey) & Kalamunda and Districts Historical Society (1996).  Rails in the hills : a history of the railway from Midland to Karragullen, 1891-1949 Kalamund & Districts Historical Society, Kalamunda, W.A

References

External links

Suburbs of Perth, Western Australia
Darling Range
Suburbs in the City of Armadale